Peter Bradley McIntyre (February 9, 1872 – April 20, 1952) was a member of the Wisconsin State Assembly.

Biography
McIntyre was born on February 9, 1872, in Muscoda, Wisconsin. He went on to work for the Federal Land Bank. He married Sarah Elizabeth Chandler in 1897.

Political career
McIntyre was a member of the Assembly from 1937 to 1944. Previously, he was Clerk of Muscoda from 1897 to 1908 and Chairman of Muscoda in 1904. He was a Republican.

References

People from Muscoda, Wisconsin
Republican Party members of the Wisconsin State Assembly
1872 births
1952 deaths